was the empress consort of Emperor Kōkaku of Japan.  She enjoys the distinction of being the last daughter of an emperor who would herself rise to the position of empress.  When she was later given the title of Empress Dowager, she became the first person to be honored with that title while still living since 1168.

Early life 

She was the only child of Emperor Go-Momozono; and she became the wife of the Emperor's adopted heir, marrying her adoptive brother who would later be known as Emperor Kōkaku. Although her own children died in infancy, she functioned as official mother to the heir who would become Emperor Ninkō.

Family relationships
 Father: Emperor Go-Momozono of Japan (5 August 1758 – 16 December 1779), 118th Emperor of Japan
 Mother: Konoe Koreko (26 January 1760 – 6 November 1783), daughter of Konoe Uchisaki
 Husband and adopted brother: Emperor Kōkaku of Japan (23 September 1771 – 11 December 1840), 119th Emperor of Japan, Yoshiko's second cousin twice removed in the biological male line
 Children: Prince Masuhito (15 February 1800 – 27 April 1800) and Prince Toshihito (25 February 1816 – 14 March 1821)

Empress consort
Yoshiko's father, Emperor Go-Momozono, died without a son when she was ten months old. To avoid dynastic interregnum, Retired Empress Go-Sakuramachi and her chief adviser encouraged the dying emperor to adopt Prince Morohito, whose biological father was Prince Sukehito, the second Prince Kan'in. Morohito, who would be known as Emperor Kōkaku later, acceded to the throne at age eight.

Retired Empress Go-Sakuramachi engaged Yoshiko to the new Emperor.  Yoshiko formally became Empress consort to Emperor Kōkaku at age 15. She bore two sons, both of whom died in infancy.

Empress dowager
In 1816, Emperor Ninkō granted Empress Yoshiko the title of Empress Dowager after Emperor Kōkaku abdicated.

Buddhist nun
Shortly after Emperor Kōkaku's death, Dowager Empress Yoshiko became a Buddhist nun.

Yoshiko died at age 67 and was buried Senyū-ji, which is in Higashiyama-ku, Kyoto.   Her memory is officially honored at her husband's mausoleum, which is known as Nochi-no-tsukinowa no misasagi.

Ancestry

See also
 Japanese empresses
 Ōmiya Palace

Notes

References 
 Fujita, Satoru. (1994). Bakumatsu no Tennō. Tokyo: Kodansha. 
 Ponsonby-Fane, Richard Arthur Brabazon. (1959).  The Imperial House of Japan. Kyoto: Ponsonby Memorial Society. OCLC 194887
 ___. (2002). . Tokyo: . ;  OCLC 51932430

Japanese empresses
Japanese princesses
1779 births
1846 deaths
Princess Yoshiko
Konoe family
Princess Yoshiko
Princess Yoshiko
Princess Yoshiko
Princess Yoshiko
Princess Yoshiko
Princess Yoshiko
Princess Yoshiko
Princess Yoshiko
Princess Yoshiko
Princess Yoshiko
Japanese Buddhist nuns
19th-century Buddhist nuns